Rumoka may refer to:
Volcan Rumoka, a volcano in the Democratic Republic of the Congo
Rumoka, Ciechanów County, a village in Masovian Voivodeship (east-central Poland)
Rumoka, Mława County, a village in Masovian Voivodeship (east-central Poland)